Percy Adamson was an early twentieth-century American soccer player who was captain of the Brooklyn Field Club when it won the 1914 National Challenge Cup.

Adamson played for Brooklyn Field Club as early as 1910.
On May 16, 1914, Adamson scored the first goal in the final of the 1914 National Challenge Cup which was the first time this tournament was held.  In September 1916, while living in Sheepshead Bay, New York he was still listed with the Brooklyn Field Club .

In September 1914, he became the head coach of the Columbia University soccer team.

References

American soccer coaches
American expatriate soccer players
Brooklyn Field Club players
Columbia Lions men's soccer coaches
National Association Football League players
People from Sheepshead Bay, Brooklyn
American soccer players
Association football forwards
Year of birth missing
Sportspeople from Brooklyn
Soccer players from New York City